The solo discography of British rock group the Shadows consists of 21 studio albums, five live albums, 25 EPs and 67 singles. They are known for having been the backing group for Cliff Richard in the 1950s and 1960s; however, they were also extremely successful without Richard, and had several number-one hits, notably their first "Apache" in 1960.

Albums

Studio albums

Live albums

Compilation albums

Main compilation albums

Budget compilation albums

Foreign compilation albums

Box sets

Video albums

EPs

Singles

1950s–1960s

1970s

1980s

Sheet music (musical notation)
All the hit (& misses) singles e.g. Apache (et al.) were published as individual (2xA4 page) sheet music during the release of the single until the late 1970s when publishers switched to books featuring multiple hits.
A1. The Album of Guitar Favourites, 1961, The Shadows Music Ltd/Belinda Ltd. No ISBN
A2. The 2nd Album of Guitar Favourities, 1961, The Shadows Music Ltd/Belinda Ltd. No ISBN
A3. The 3rd Album of Guitar Favourities, 1962, The Shadows Music Ltd/Belinda Ltd. No ISBN
A4. The 4th Album of Guitar Favourities, 1964, The Shadows Music Ltd/Belinda Ltd. No ISBN
A5. The 5th Album of Guitar Favourities, 1964, The Shadows Music Ltd/Belinda Ltd. No ISBN
A6. The 6th Album of Guitar Favourities, 1965, The Shadows Music Ltd/Belinda Ltd. No ISBN
A7. The 7th Album of Guitar Favourities, 1966, The Shadows Music Ltd/Belinda Ltd. No ISBN
A8. The 8th Album of Guitar Favourities, 1966, The Shadows Music Ltd/Belinda Ltd. No ISBN
A9. The 9th Album of Guitar Favourities, 1967, The Shadows Music Ltd/Carlin Music Ltd. No ISBN
A10. The Shadows Album of Rhythm & Greens, 1964, The Shadows Music Ltd/Belinda Music Ltd. No ISBN
A11. The Shadows Modern Electric Guitar Tutor, 196?, The Shadows Music Ltd/Belinda Ltd. No ISBN
A12. The Shadows Guitar Book, 1964, Francis, Day & Hunter. No ISBN
A13. The Shadows Then and Now, 1981, EMI Music Publishing. ISBN ?
A14. The Big Hits of The Shadows, 19??, Wise Publications, 
A15. The Shadows, Guitar Legends Tab, 19??, Faber Music, 
A16. Hits of The Shadows. Off the record., 1992, IMP, ISBN ?
A17. Frank Ifield Album, 196?, Shadows Music/Belinda, no ISBN
A18. The Mersey Beat, 196?, Shadows music/Belinda, no ISBN
A19. Marvin Welch and Farrar, 1970, Music Sales Ltd. ISBN
B1. Cliff and the Shadows Album, 196?, B.Feldman & co ltd, no ISBN
B2. The Young Ones & Summer Holiday 1963, Elstree Music ltd, no ISBN
B3. Finders Keepers, 1966, Carlin Music, no ISBN
B4. Aladdin—Guitar album, 1964, Shadows Music/Belinda, no ISBN
B5. Aladdin—Vocal album, 1964, Shadows Music/Belinda, no ISBN
B6. Established 1958, 1968, Shadows Music/Carlin Music, no ISBN
C1. Play Guitar with Hank Marvin, 200?, Wise Publications, 
C2. Lick Library: Learn to play Hank Marvin, 200?, Roadrock Intl, ISBN "RDR0061"
C3. Jam with Hank Marvin, 200?, Faber Music, 
C4. Hank Marvin's Guitar Instruction Book, 200?, Hudson Music, 
C5. Lick Library: Learn to play Hank Marvin (Vol.2), 200?, Roadrock Intl, ISBN "RDR0061"
C6. Hank Marvin's Guitar Tutor, 200?, IMP, 
D1. Diamonds—piano solo with guitar chords, 1963, Francis day and Hunter, ISBN ?
D2. The Jet Harris Guitar book, Francis Day & Hunter Ltd.  (16 pages)
E1. Brian Bennett's Drum Tutor, 196?, ?, ISBN ?
E2. Guide to Teen-Beat Drumming, 1964, the Shadows Music Ltd & Belinda London Ltd.

Sheet Music (sold as individual song/tune sheets)
Apache (2 designs)
Quartermasters Stores
Man of Mystery (2 designs)
The Stranger
F.B.I.
The Frightened City
Kon Tiki (2 designs)
The Savage
Wonderful Land (2 designs)
Stars fell on stockton
Guitar Tango
Dance On
The Boys
The Girls
Foot Tapper
Atlantis
Shindig
Geronimo
Shazam!
The Rise and Fall of Flingel Bunt
Rhythm & Greens
The Miracle
Alice in Sunderland
Stingray
Mary Anne
Chu-Chi
Don't Make My Baby Blue
The War Lord
I Wish I Could Shimmy Like My Sister Arthur
I Met a Girl
Scotch on the Socks
The Dreams I Dream
A Place in the Sun
Maroc 7
Bombay Duck
Thunderbirds theme
Let Me Be the One
Run Billy Run
Riders in the Sky

See also
For the Shadows' recordings with Cliff Richard, see Cliff Richard albums discography and Cliff Richard singles discography
For the solo discography of Shadows' member Hank Marvin, see Hank Marvin discography

Notes

References

External links
cliffandshads.co.uk Cliff Richard and The Shadows discography
Sounding discography by The Shadows

Discography
Shadows, The
Shadows, The